Robinson Pérez Checo (born September 9, 1971, in Santiago de los Caballeros, Dominican Republic) is a former pitcher who played in Major League Baseball from  through . He batted and threw right-handed.

A well-traveled pitcher, Checo never was able to fulfill the potential that he showed in the minor leagues. He played for at least 13 teams in four countries during his 12-year career.

In 1989, Checo pitched for the California Angels organization in the Dominican Summer League. After that, he played for the Japan's Hiroshima Toyo Carp minor league system (1990–92) and with the China Times Eagles in the Chinese Professional Baseball League (1993–94), before returning to Hiroshima in 1995. That season, he went 15–8 with 166 strikeouts and a 2.74 ERA with the Toyo Carp and also became the first foreign pitcher to pitch a shutout in his first Central League appearance, over the Hanshin Tigers. He declined in 1996, going 4–1 with a 4.80 ERA in only nine games, but barely missed spinning a no-hitter against Hanshin with two outs in the ninth inning.

Checo joined the Boston Red Sox as a free agent before the 1997 season under a seven figure contract. Between 1997 and 1998 he played for five Red Sox-system teams, including two trips to the major-league club. A year later, he played for the Detroit, Anaheim and Los Angeles minor league organizations, appearing with the Dodgers late in the season. In 2000, he finished 8–3 with a 3.63 ERA for Triple-A Albuquerque Dukes.

In 16 major league games, Checo posted a 3–5 record with 30 strikeouts and a 7.61 ERA in 32 23 innings. In nine minor league seasons, he went 43–27 with 588 SO and a 3.78 ERA in 109 appearances.

External links

Japanese Baseball Daily 
Retrosheet

1971 births
Águilas Cibaeñas players
Albuquerque Dukes players
Boston Red Sox players
China Times Eagles players
Dominican Republic expatriate baseball players in Japan
Dominican Republic expatriate baseball players in Taiwan
Dominican Republic expatriate baseball players in the United States
Estrellas Orientales players
Gulf Coast Red Sox players
Hiroshima Toyo Carp players

Living people
Los Angeles Dodgers players
Major League Baseball pitchers
Major League Baseball players from the Dominican Republic
Nippon Professional Baseball pitchers
Pawtucket Red Sox players
People from Santiago de los Caballeros
San Bernardino Stampede players
Sarasota Red Sox players
Toledo Mud Hens players
Trenton Thunder players